The Division of Tasmania in Australia was created in 1901 and abolished in 1903.

Members

Election results
For multi-member elections, elected candidates are listed in bold. Each Tasmanian elector at the 1901 election cast one vote.

Elections in the 1900s

1901

References

 Australian Electoral Commission. Federal Election results

Australian federal electoral results by division